Charles Clyde Ball (October 21, 1881 – September 21, 1955) was a high school principal and American football and basketball player and coach. In 1906, he served as the head football coach at the University of Omaha (a now-defunct institution later known as Bellevue College, not to be confused with Bellevue University that exists today). The Charles Ball Academy in San Antonio, Texas is named in his honor.

References

1881 births
1955 deaths
American football quarterbacks
Coe Kohawks athletic directors
Coe Kohawks football players
People from Lake County, South Dakota
Players of American football from South Dakota
American school principals